The 1964 William & Mary Indians football team was an American football team that represented the College of William & Mary as a member of the Southern Conference (SoCon) during the 1964 NCAA University Division football season. In their first season under head coach Marv Levy, the Indians compiled a 4–6 record with a mark of 4–3 in conference play, tying for fourth place in the SoCon.

Schedule

References

William and Mary
William & Mary Tribe football seasons
William and Mary Indians football